Harold Wood Hospital was a hospital in east London, United Kingdom. It was located in Gubbins Lane, Harold Wood in Romford, in the London Borough of Havering. It was managed by Barking, Havering and Redbridge Hospitals NHS Trust. The Havering Campus of London South Bank University, an NHS polyclinic and a long term conditions unit continue to operate at the hospital site, and a residential development by Countryside Properties known as Kings Park is in development.

History
The hospital was opened in 1909 by West Ham County Borough council, as the Grange convalescent home for children, which operated with the nearby Plaistow fever hospital. The Grange had been a private house, built in 1884 by John Compton, owner of the Gubbins estate. The convalescent home was maintained by the county borough until the Second World War, as an emergency hospital. After the war it became a permanent hospital, and in the 1960s was significantly enlarged.

After services relocated to Queen's Hospital and to King George Hospital in Redbridge, the hospital was closed on 13 December 2006. The site vacated by the hospital was earmarked for a 470-home housing development. The original plan to keep certain NHS facilities was superseded and the entire plot was approved for residential development. Local residents opposed the proposal of over 800 dwellings, including a 9-storey block. A residential development by Countryside Properties known as Kings Park is in development.

See also 
 Healthcare in London
 List of hospitals in England

References

Houses completed in 1884
Hospitals disestablished in 2006
Defunct hospitals in London
Health in the London Borough of Havering
NHS hospitals in London